Just Like This is a studio album of previously unreleased material recorded in November and December 1976 by Mick Ronson. It was supposed to become Ronson's third solo album after Slaughter on 10th Avenue (1974) and Play Don't Worry (1975), but due to low selling amounts of these albums, record company RCA refused to release this third album in 1977.

Just Like This was finally released six years after Ronson's death (1993), on 15 March 1999, by New Millennium Music (Burning Airlines label) in a limited amount. A rare extra limited amount has an extra bonus CD with seven demos and two outtakes. The release was backed by Mick Ronson's widow Suzanne Ronson.

Two songs from the album, "I'd Give Anything to See You" and "Hard Life" were included in the 2017 feature-length biographical documentary, and compilation Soundtrack, entitled Beside Bowie: the Mick Ronson Story.

Track listing 
All tracks composed by Mick Ronson; except where indicated
CD One:
 "Just Like This" (T-Bone Walker)
 "I'd Give Anything to See You"
 "Takin' a Train" (Jay Davis)
 "Hard Life"
 "(I'm Just a) Junkie for Your Love" (Ricky Fataar)
 "Crazy Love" (Blondie Chaplin)
 "Hey Grandma" (Skip Spence)
 "Is That Any Way"
 "I've Got No Secrets"
 "Hard Headed Woman"
 "Roll Like the River" (Ronson, Mick Barakan, Bobby Chen, Burt Carey)
 "Angel No. 9" (Craig Fuller)

CD Two:
 "Crazy Love" (demo)
 "I'd Give Anything to See You (Right Now)" - (demo)
 "Takin' The Next Train" (demo)
 "Hard Life" (Ballad version)
 "Junkie" (demo)
 "Hey Grandma" (demo)
 "Just Like This" (demo)
 "Ronno's Bar & Grill" (studio outtake)
 "In the Old Mountains of the East Riding" (studio outtake)

Personnel
Mick Ronson – vocals, guitar
Shane Fontayne – guitar, backing vocals
Jay Davis – bass, backing vocals
Burt Carey – bass
Bobby Chen – drums, backing vocals
Executive Producer: Suzanne Ronson

Notes
Recorded in November and December 1976 at Bearsville Sound Studio.

References

Mick Ronson albums
Albums produced by Mick Ronson
Compilation albums published posthumously
1999 compilation albums